Mellen Township is a civil township of Menominee County in the U.S. state of Michigan.  The population was 1,260 at the 2000 census. It is named after pioneer settler Mellen Smith (1829–1905), who served as the first postmaster at Wallace.

Communities
Ingalls has a post office with ZIP code 49848.
Wallace is an unincorporated community located 15 miles north of Menominee on US Highway 41. It is a small village with the DeYoung Zoo, a used-car dealership, a tavern, lumber yard, post office, ice maker, wood businesses, grocery market, service station, and a liquidator store.  There are also three churches: Country Bible Church (non-denominational), a Covenant Church, and a Lutheran church. The Mellen Elementary School is also located in Wallace. Wallace was originally called Wallace's Siding after Wallace Sutherland (1858–1890), who was assigned to the railroad depot. It was then shorted to Wallace by the time the post office was established in 1877. On April 12, 1931, Wallace suffered a fire that destroyed most of the village. Wallace has a post office with ZIP code 49893.

Geography

Demographics
As of the census of 2000, there were 1,260 people, 520 households, and 368 families residing in the township. There were 674 housing units at an average density of 21.9 per square mile (8.4/km2). The racial makeup of the township was 97.54% White, 0.08% African American, 0.79% Native American, 0.32% Asian, and 1.27% from two or more races. Hispanic or Latino of any race were 0.24% of the population.

There were 520 households, out of which 33.3% had children under the age of 18 living with them, 61.5% were married couples living together, 6.2% had a female householder with no husband present, and 29.2% were non-families. 26.2% of all households were made up of individuals, and 9.2% had someone living alone who was 65 years of age or older.  The average household size was 2.42 and the average family size was 2.94.

In the township the population was spread out, with 26.6% under the age of 18, 5.7% from 18 to 24, 26.6% from 25 to 44, 26.6% from 45 to 64, and 14.5% who were 65 years of age or older.  The median age was 40 years. For every 100 females, there were 104.5 males.  For every 100 females age 18 and over, there were 102.0 males.

The median income for a household in the township was $35,435, and the median income for a family was $41,875. Males had a median income of $32,212 versus $18,833 for females. The per capita income for the township was $16,096.  About 6.3% of families and 10.3% of the population were below the poverty line, including 15.5% of those under age 18 and 10.0% of those age 65 or over.

Notable people
John Noppenberg, American football player

References

Townships in Menominee County, Michigan
Marinette micropolitan area
Townships in Michigan